Mary Carpenter was a social reformer.

Mary Carpenter may also refer to:
Mary Chapin Carpenter (born 1958), American singer, songwriter and musician
Mary Elizabeth Sutherland Carpenter, better known as Liz Carpenter (1920–2010), writer, feminist and reporter
Mary Imogen Carpenter (1912–1993), musician, composer, music lecturer, and actor
Mary P. Carpenter (1840–1900), American inventor